Jean or Janet Sinclair was the Scottish nurse of Mary, Queen of Scots.

In a letter to Mary of Guise written in 1553, Sinclair mentions her long service starting as nurse to her short-lived son Prince James, born in 1540.

Mary, Queen of Scots was born at Linlithgow Palace in December 1542. At Linlithgow on 22 March 1543, Mary of Guise asked Jean Sinclair to unwrap the queen from her swaddling clothes to show the English ambassador Ralph Sadler that she was a healthy infant. The scene was depicted by a 19th-century artist Benjamin Haydon.
Cardinal David Beaton gave the nurse at Linlithgow £11 on 29 December 1542.

In July 1543, the infant queen was moved to Stirling Castle. As the war with England now known as Rough Wooing continued, Mary and her household including her governess Janet Stewart, Lady Fleming went to Dumbarton Castle on the Clyde and sailed to France.

When Jean Sinclair wrote to Mary of Guise from the Château de Blois in 1553 she signed her letter "Jaine Syncler, nureis to our soveraine lady".

She was anxious that she had been omitted from the household allowances and hoped that Mary of Guise would be able to help. Sinclair wrote that she was "come of honest folks" and would not be persuaded to abandon the service of Queen Mary.

Around this time, Françoise de Paroy, d'Estainville, Mary's governess, wrote to Mary of Guise that more attendants, beside the nurse or nourrice were required. The young queen's household in France was re-organised again in 1554 by Comptroller Astier, who subsequently came to Scotland as director of military finance during the refortification of Eyemouth and Inchkeith.

She was granted lands at Cornton. Her husband was John Kemp, probably a brother of Henry Kemp of Thomastoun, pursemaster to James V and keeper of his jewels.

Jean (or Janet) Sinclair died sometime before 1557.

References

Court of Mary, Queen of Scots
16th-century Scottish women
Jean
Royal nurses